Ramón Bojórquez Salcido (b. March 6, 1961) is a Mexican convicted mass murderer who is currently on death row in California's San Quentin State Prison. He was convicted for the 1989 murders of six female family members and one male supervisor at his workplace. His victims included his wife and two of his daughters, four-year-old Sofía and 22-month-old Teresa. A third daughter, three-year-old Carmina, was left lying in a field beside the bodies of her sisters for thirty-six hours after being slashed across the throat by her father but was eventually rescued.

Salcido's victims were killed in the cities of Sonoma and Cotati, California. Maria, Marion, and Ruth Richards were killed at a house at Lakewood Drive in Cotati, and Salcido's relatives and Toovey were killed in Sonoma.

Details 
On April 14, 1989, after a night of drinking and snorting cocaine, Ramon Salcido drove his three young daughters to a county dump, slashed their throats, and threw them into a ditch, killing Sofia and Teresa; Carmina survived. Salcido then drove to Cotati, California, where he killed his mother-in-law and her two daughters. He then returned to his home in Boyes Hot Springs, where he shot his wife, Angela Salcido. He then went to the Grand Cru winery, his place of employment, where he killed a co-worker, Tracey Toovey.<ref>Salcido tape tells how murder rampage began, 'Los Angeles Times, September 16, 1989.</ref>

Salcido fled after the killings to Mexico via Calexico. He was arrested in Guasave, Mexico, on April 19, 1989. When arrested, Salcido told police that he committed the murders because he suspected his wife was having an affair with a coworker.

 Victims 

 Ángela Salcido, 24, wife of Ramon Salcido
 Sofía Salcido, 4, daughter of Angela Salcido
 Carmina Salcido, 3, daughter of Angela Salcido (survived)
 Teresa Salcido, 1, daughter of Angela Salcido
 Marion Louise Richards, 47, mother of Angela Salcido
 Ruth Richards, 12, daughter of Marion Richards
 Maria Richards, 8, daughter of Marion Richards
 Tracy Toovey, 35, winemaster at Grand Cru winery

Trial
Salcido's trial had been moved out of Sonoma County due to extensive news coverage of the case. On October 30, 1990, Salcido was found guilty by a jury of six counts of first-degree murder, one count of second-degree murder, and two counts of attempted murder. On November 16, 1990, Salcido was sentenced by a jury to the death penalty. Marteen Miller, Salcido's attorney, contended that his client was under the influence of cocaine and alcohol during the slayings. The defense had sought a verdict of second-degree murder or manslaughter under the circumstance that the drugs had put Mr. Salcido in a state of psychotic depression when the rampage began.

Media
Investigation Discovery portrayed the Ramon Salcido case in the docudrama series "Evil I", episode: "Killer in the Sun", originally aired 2012.

The investigative reporting series ABC's 20/20 features exclusive interviews with survivor Carmina Salcido; the episode is titled 'What Happened to Carmina", originally aired in October 2009.

See also
 List of homicides in California
 Capital punishment in California
 List of death row inmates in the United States
 List of familicides in the United States

 Notes 

 External links 
 Not Lost Forever: My Story of Survival by Carmina Salcido with Steve Jackson
 Daddy Dearest
 Killer of 7 gets penalty of death The New York Times'' (November 17, 1990)

1961 births
1989 murders in the United States
Criminals from California
Deaths by stabbing in the United States
Familicides
Living people
Mass shootings in the United States
Mexican mass murderers
Mexican people convicted of murder
Mexican spree killers
Murder in the San Francisco Bay Area
People convicted of murder by California
People from Los Mochis
People from Sonoma County, California
Prisoners sentenced to death by California
Stabbing attacks in the United States